The Symphony No. 4 is an orchestral composition by the American composer John Harbison.  The work was commissioned by the Seattle Symphony with contributions from the philanthropists Richard and Constance Albrecht.  It was given its world premiere in Seattle on June 17, 2004 by the Seattle Symphony under the direction of Gerard Schwarz.

Composition

Background
The symphony was composed during a turbulent period in Harbison's life when his wife became very ill.  The composer wrote in the score program notes, "One morning at eight, in Bogliasco, Italy, where I was working, I receive a phone call - two o'clock the caller's time. I cannot describe the knowledge that struck during that call except to say that the breath of mortality, bearing at this moment on the person closest to me, came suddenly and radically near."  He continued:

Structure
The symphony has a duration of roughly 27 minutes and is composed in five movements:
Fanfare
Intermezzo
Scherzo
Threnody
Finale

Instrumentation
The work is scored for a large orchestra comprising three flutes (3rd doubling piccolo), three oboes (3rd doubling English horn), three clarinets (3rd doubling bass clarinet), three bassoons (3rd doubling contrabassoon), four horns, two trumpets, two trombones, tuba, timpani, three percussionists, piano, harp, and strings.

Reception
The symphony has been praised by music critics.  Lisa Hirsch of the San Francisco Classical Voice wrote, "It's an engrossing work, full of interesting detail and structural experimentation. Like the Mahler and Ravel, it deploys a very large orchestra, but the effects provided by that orchestra seem more studied and less organic than those in its companions, thought through rather than arising naturally from the melodic and harmonic elements of the work." Keith Powers of the Boston Classical Review compared the symphony with Harbison's 1999 opera The Great Gatsby, writing:
Matthew Guerrieri of The Boston Globe was slightly more critical of the work, however, saying "...the whole symphony feels like workings-through, of influences, forms, processes, difficulties."  He added, "The opening and closing movements had crisp force; the quieter movements, especially the piecemeal transparency of the 'Intermezzo,' were more skittish and hesitant."

References

4
2003 compositions
Harbison 4
Music commissioned by the Seattle Symphony